François Xavier Edmond Marie Lesage (25 October 1885 – 3 August 1968) was a French horse rider who competed in the 1924 Summer Olympics and in the 1932 Summer Olympics. He was born in Moret-sur-Loing and died in Gisors.

Biography
Xavier Lesage was Colonel in the French Military, also decorated with the Légion d'honneur.

In 1924 he and his horse Plumard won the bronze medal in the individual dressage competition in the Olympics - see here. Eight years later he and his horse Taine won the gold medal in the individual dressage as well as in the team dressage.

He was also the commander of the black squadron "Cadre Noir" of Saumur, which earned him the title "Grand Dieu".

References

External links
 
 

1885 births
1968 deaths
French dressage riders
Olympic equestrians of France
French male equestrians
Equestrians at the 1924 Summer Olympics
Equestrians at the 1932 Summer Olympics
Olympic gold medalists for France
Olympic bronze medalists for France
Olympic medalists in equestrian
Medalists at the 1932 Summer Olympics
Medalists at the 1924 Summer Olympics